The Absheron Peninsula is a peninsula in Azerbaijan. It is the location of Baku, the biggest and the most populous city of the country, and also the Baku metropolitan area, with its satellite cities Sumqayit and Khyrdalan.

There are three districts, of which two are urban (Baku and Sumqayit), and one, (Absheron Rayon), is suburban district in Absheron region.

Though technically the easternmost extension of the Caucasus Mountains, the landscape is only mildly hilly, a gently undulating plain that ends in a long spit of sand dunes known as Shah Dili, and now declared the Absheron National Park. In this part, the peninsula is dissected by ravines and characterized by frequent salt lakes.

Etymology
The name "Absheron" comes from Persian āb šuran (salty waters). This also gave its name to the city of Apsheronsk in Russia.

According to Conrad Malte-Brun in 1810, an alternative name for the peninsula was Okoressa.

History

During the late 19th century exploitation of the peninsula's petroleum resources caused large scale migrations of Iranian laborers to the Caucasus and Central Asia.

Geography

The Absheron peninsula is located in eastern Azerbaijan, along the western coast of the Caspian Sea with layers of deposits from the Cretaceous, Palaeogene, Neogene, Pliocene and Quaternary periods. The lithological composition up to the Neogene layers is made up of clays, sandy clays, sands and limestones. Middle Pliocene sediments are sandy clays. These are thick in areas with highly mineralized groundwaters. Fresh groundwater is unable to permeate the thick clays to reach underlying sequences, by the overlying layers of sediment deposits have a lower salinity. In the western areas of the peninsula there are outcrops of low permeability clays from the Cretaceous, Palaogene, Neogene, and Lower Pilocene. These clays are deeper in the eastern areas and covered by Quaternary sediments. Although the peninsula is tectonically a southeast continuous of the Greater Caucasus, its Quaternary deposits are isolated.

Climate
The Absheron Peninsula has a temperate semi-arid climate (Köppen climate classification: BSk) with warm and dry summers, cool and occasionally wet winters, and strong winds all year long. The peninsula is the most arid part of Azerbaijan (precipitation here is around or less than  a year). The majority of the light annual precipitation occurs in seasons other than summer, but none of these seasons are particularly wet. The natural vegetation of the Absheron Peninsula is dry steppe and semi-desert. Due to the semi-arid climate, local agriculture requires irrigation.

Environmental issues

Petrochemical and refining industries on the peninsula have had environmental impacts on the Caspian Sea shore and the sea itself.

Economy

Beginning in the 1870s, the Absheron Peninsula was the site of some of the world's earliest petroleum production. Much of the landscape remains scarred with rusting oil derricks. Despite serious problems with environmental damage and pollution, the Absheron is known for its flowers, horticulture, mulberries and figs. The northern coast has wide though less-than-pristine beaches which are popular local tourist attractions.

Wealthy people have settled in the Absheron Peninsula, including Robert Nobel and Zeynalabdin Taghiyev.

Natural resources
There are natural resources such as oil, lime, sand and salt in the peninsula. The peninsula has famous lakes like Masazir, Khojahasan and Boyuk Shor. Several ancient oil wells of the world are located in the Absheron Peninsula. Azerbaijan is in the first place for the variety of mud volcanoes in Absheron. 400 out of 800 mud volcanoes in the Asia (1100 in the world) are located within the Southern Caspian oil-gas basin as well as in the dry areas of Azerbaaijan and other islands in the water area of the Caspian Sea.

Main roads
The main highways of the country are in Baku and the Absheron Peninsula. These are the highways of Heydar Aliyev International Airport, Sea port, Baku Railway Station and others which connect the capital to other regions of the country. 
Major oil and gas pipelines go through here. Baku TRACECA (Transport Corridor Europe–the Caucasus–Asia) is the major point of the international traffic corridor. Within this project, Azerbaijan participates in the re-establishment of the historic Silk Road.

References

External links 
Geography of Azerbaijan
Short Documentary about pollution from chemical and oil industries on the peninsula

Peninsulas of Azerbaijan